Sakuye Takahashi (高橋 作衛 also spelled Sakuya Takahashi or Sakuyei Takahashi, b. ca. 1865 - d. September 12, 1920) was a Japanese expert on international law.

During the First Sino-Japanese War, he served as legal adviser for the Imperial Japanese Navy, and in that capacity tried to refute the allegations regarding massacre at Port Arthur. During the Russo-Japanese War he served as legal adviser for the Japanese Ministry of Foreign Affairs. He also served as professor of law at Tokyo Imperial University and as chief editor of Japanese Review of International Law and Diplomacy.

Under the cabinet of Prime Minister Ōkuma Shigenobu, he served as Director of the Bureau of Legislation, and was charged with coordination on legislative affairs between government and parliament.

Works (partial list)
 Cases in International Law during the Chino-Japanese War (Cambridge, 1899)
 International Law Applied to the Russo-Japanese War (London, 1908)

Notes

External links
 Full text of Takahashi's book International law applied to the Russo-Japanese war, with the decisions of the Japanese prize courts (publ 1908)
 Full text of Takahashi's book Cases on International Law During the Chino-Japanese War (publ 1899)
 Douglas Howland, "Japan’s Civilized War: International Law as Diplomacy in the Sino-Japanese War (1894-1895)" Journal of the History of International Law 9 (2007) pp. 179–201

1865 births
1920 deaths
20th-century Japanese lawyers
19th-century Japanese lawyers